John Charles McGeachey, surname sometimes spelled McGeachy, (May 13, 1864 – April 5, 1930), was a Major League Baseball player who played outfield for the Detroit Wolverines, St. Louis Maroons, Indianapolis Hoosiers, Brooklyn Ward's Wonders, Philadelphia Athletics, and Boston Reds from -.

See also
List of Major League Baseball career stolen bases leaders

References

External links

1864 births
1930 deaths
Major League Baseball outfielders
Baseball players from Massachusetts
Indianapolis Hoosiers (NL) players
Philadelphia Athletics (AA 1891) players
Boston Reds (AA) players
Detroit Wolverines players
St. Louis Maroons players
Brooklyn Ward's Wonders players
19th-century baseball players
Holyoke (minor league baseball) players
Waterbury (minor league baseball) players
Long Island A's players
Providence Grays (minor league) players
Augusta Kennebecs players